LaCour (pronounced Lah Coor) is an unincorporated community in Pointe Coupee Parish, Louisiana, United States. It is near Raccourci Old River, an oxbow lake in the Mississippi River system.

Etymology
The community is named after the Colin LaCour estate. The LaCour family were slave owners that ran a plantation in the area in the late 1700s.

Notable people
LaCour is the birthplace and childhood home of Major General John Archer Lejeune (1867–1942), former Commandant of the United States Marine Corps.

References

Unincorporated communities in Pointe Coupee Parish, Louisiana
Unincorporated communities in Louisiana